The 2021 International Women's Football Tournament of Manaus (also known as the 2021 Torneio Internacional de Manaus de Futebol Feminino) was an invitational football tournament held in Brazil. The 2021 tournament was played from November 25 to December 1, 2021.

Tournament rules allow a 23-member roster. Players marked (c) were named as captain for their national squad. Totals for caps and goals, club affiliations, and ages are as of the opening day of the tournament on 25 November 2021.

Squads

Brazil 
Coach:  Pia Sundhage

Érika (Corinthians) and Thaís (Palmeiras) were replaced by Gabi Nunes and Ivana Fuso, respectively. The following 24 players were called up for the tournament.

Chile 
Coach:  José Letelier

The following 22 players were called up for the tournament.

India 
Coach:  Thomas Dennerby

The following 23 players were called up for the tournament.

Venezuela 
Coach:  Vincenzo Conti

The coach  Pamela Conti tested positive for COVID-19 and was replaced by her brother, the assistant coach Vincenzo Conti. The following 23 players were called up for the tournament.

References

External links

International
Torn
2021 squads
Association football women's tournament squads